Lafonius is an extinct genus dvinosaurian temnospondyl within the family Trimerorhachidae. It is known from Carboniferous of New Mexico.

See also

 Prehistoric amphibian
 List of prehistoric amphibians

References

Dvinosaurs
Carboniferous temnospondyls of North America
Fossil taxa described in 1973